Gowaravan (also Romanized as Gowrāvān and Gūrāvān; also known as Gorāvān) is a village in Khanamrud Rural District of the Central District of Heris County, East Azerbaijan province, Iran. At the 2006 National Census, its population was 768 in 179 households. The following census in 2011 counted 858 people in 206 households. The latest census in 2016 showed a population of 796 people in 222 households; it was the largest village in its rural district.

References 

Heris County

Populated places in East Azerbaijan Province

Populated places in Heris County